Roger Michael Young (born 29 June 1943) is a former  and British Lions International rugby union player.

He was capped twenty-six times as a scrum-half for Ireland between 1965 and 1971 and scored one try for Ireland against Scotland in 1965.

Young was selected for the 1966 British Lions tour to Australia and New Zealand and played two internationals against  and one against New Zealand. He also went on the 1968 British Lions tour to South Africa and played in one international against .

Educated at Methodist College Belfast, he played club rugby for Queen's University R.F.C. and Collegians.

References

1943 births
Living people
Irish rugby union players
Ireland international rugby union players
Ulster Rugby players
Rugby union scrum-halves
British & Irish Lions rugby union players from Ireland
Queen's University RFC players
People educated at Methodist College Belfast